The 1990 Philadelphia Wings season marked the team's fourth season of operation and second league championship.

Game log
Reference:

(p) - denotes playoff game
 * MILL Championship

Roster
Reference:

 General Manager: Mike French
 Assistant General Manager: Peter Tyson
 Coach: Dave Evans
 Assistant coach: Mike Paige
 Equipment Manager: Larry Subotich
 Trainer: Kelly Donnelly
 Assistant trainer: Nick Coppolino

See also
 Philadelphia Wings
 1990 MILL season

References

External links
https://web.archive.org/web/20071102134725/http://www.wingszone.com/whistory/history.htm

Philadelphia Wings seasons
Phil
1990 in lacrosse